Robert Whiting (6 January 1883 – 28 April 1917), sometimes known as Pom Pom Whiting, was an English professional footballer who played as a goalkeeper in the Football League for Chelsea. He made 253 appearances in the Southern League for Brighton & Hove Albion and was a part of the club's 1909–10 Southern League First Division and 1910 FA Charity Shield-winning teams.

Personal life 
Whiting was married with three sons and the second-youngest, William, later followed in his footsteps to play as a goalkeeper for Tunbridge Wells Rangers. In December 1914, four months after the outbreak of the First World War, Whiting enlisted in the Football Battalion of the Middlesex Regiment. After arriving in France in November 1915, Whiting became infected with scabies at the front and was sent to a hospital in Brighton for treatment. As a result of the discovery of his wife's pregnancy and the death of his brother on the Somme in August 1916, Whiting went AWOL. He was caught in October 1916 and court-martialled in France in February 1917. A shortage of men meant that his sentence of 9 months' hard labour lasted just one week before he rejoined the Football Battalion. He was killed in action whilst assaulting a fortified German position at  Oppy Wood during the Battle of Arras on 28 April 1917 and is commemorated on the Arras Memorial.

Honours 
Brighton & Hove Albion
Southern League First Division: 1909–10
 FA Charity Shield: 1910

Career statistics

References

1883 births
1917 deaths
Footballers from Canning Town
English footballers
Association football goalkeepers
West Ham United F.C. players
Tunbridge Wells F.C. players
Chelsea F.C. players
Brighton & Hove Albion F.C. players
English Football League players
Southern Football League players
British Army personnel of World War I
Middlesex Regiment soldiers
British military personnel killed in World War I
British Army personnel who were court-martialled
English prisoners and detainees
Prisoners and detainees of the British military
Military personnel from London